Gil Philip Castillo (born October 21, 1965) is an American professional mixed martial artist. A professional from 1998 until 2006, he fought in the UFC, WEC and King of the Cage. Castillo is the former King of the Cage Middleweight Superfight Champion.

Background
Castillo excelled in wrestling at Antioch High School and after competing for California State University at Long Beach, he entered the trials for the Olympic team. He went 2–2, and needed to win his fourth match to get on the squad that trains for the alternate team, but lost on points. After becoming a licensed stockbroker, Castillo found Brazilian jiu-jitsu in 1995, and was trained by Cesar Gracie and Ralph Gracie before they introduced him to mixed martial arts.

Mixed martial arts career

Early career
Castillo made his professional debut in early 1997 in a tournament. He won his debut via rear-naked choke submission only 40 seconds into the first round. He won his next fight after his opponent broke his wrist during the fight, and in the tournament final, Castillo faced veteran Vernon White and won via armbar submission in just three minutes. Castillo fought for the King of the Cage Middleweight Superfight Championship on April 29, 2001 against then-champion Joe Hurley. In a back-and-forth fight, Castillo scored seven takedowns on the Lion's Den fighter, and won via unanimous decision. Castillo then fought future Strikeforce Welterweight Champion Nate Marquardt for the IFC Welterweight Championship and won via unanimous decision before being invited to compete in the UFC.

UFC
At UFC 33 on September 28, 2001, Castillo made his UFC debut, fighting a much-larger Dave Menne for the first-ever UFC Middleweight Championship. Castillo lost via unanimous decision and was handed his first professional loss.

After picking up a unanimous decision win over Chris Brennan at UFC 35, Castillo fought for the UFC Welterweight Championship against then-champion Matt Hughes at UFC 40 on November 22, 2002. Castillo lost via doctor stoppage due to a cut received in the first round.

WEC
Castillo then began fighting for the WEC, making his debut for the organization on March 27, 2003 at WEC 6 against Chris Williams. Castillo won via TKO.

Castillo fought on May 21, 2004 at WEC 10 against future IFL Lightweight Champion Ryan Schultz and lost via TKO. His last appearance for the organization was on October 14, 2005 at WEC 17 against Steve Ramirez. Castillo won via TKO. Castillo's fought last on April 1, 2006 in an IFC event against current UFC Welterweight Jake Ellenberger. Castillo lost via TKO in the first round.

Mixed martial arts record

|-
| Loss
| align=center| 11–5
| Jake Ellenberger
| TKO (punches)
| IFC Cage Combat
| 
| align=center| 1
| align=center| 1:30
| Sacramento, California, United States
| 
|-
| Win
| align=center| 11–4
| Steve Ramerez
| TKO (punches)
| WEC 17
| 
| align=center| 2
| align=center| 4:01
| Lemoore, California, United States
| 
|-
| Loss
| align=center| 10–4
| Ryan Schultz
| Decision (majority)
| WEC 10
| 
| align=center| 3
| align=center| 5:00
| Lemoore, California, United States
| 
|-
| Loss
| align=center| 10–3
| Renato Verissimo
| TKO (corner stoppage)
| Rumble on the Rock 4
| 
| align=center| 2
| align=center| 5:00
| Honolulu, Hawaii, United States
| 
|-
| Win
| align=center| 10–2
| Chris Williams
| TKO (corner stoppage)
| WEC 6: Return of a Legend
| 
| align=center| 1
| align=center| 5:00
| Lemoore, California, United States
| 
|-
| Loss
| align=center| 9–2
| Matt Hughes
| TKO (cut)
| UFC 40
| 
| align=center| 1
| align=center| 5:00
| Las Vegas, Nevada, United States
|For the UFC Welterweight Championship.
|-
| Win
| align=center| 9–1
| Chris Brennan
| Decision (unanimous)
| UFC 35
| 
| align=center| 3
| align=center| 5:00
| Uncasville, Connecticut, United States
|Return to Welterweight.
|-
| Loss
| align=center| 8–1
| Dave Menne
| Decision (unanimous)
| UFC 33
| 
| align=center| 5
| align=center| 5:00
| Las Vegas, Nevada, United States
|For the inaugural UFC Middleweight Championship.
|-
| Win
| align=center| 8–0
| Nate Marquardt
| Decision (unanimous)
| IFC 14 Warriors Challenge 14
| 
| align=center| 5
| align=center| 5:00
| California, United States
|Won the IFC Welterweight Championship.
|-
| Win
| align=center| 7–0
| Joe Hurley
| Decision (unanimous)
| KOTC 8: Bombs Away
| 
| align=center| 3
| align=center| 5:00
| Williams, California, United States
|Won the King of the Cage Middleweight Superfight Championship 
|-
| Win
| align=center| 6–0
| Raymond Mansfield
| Submission (omoplata)
| IFC Warriors Challenge 10
| 
| align=center| 1
| align=center| N/A
| Friant, California, United States 
|Middleweight debut.
|-
| Win
| align=center| 5–0
| Robert Ferguson
| Decision (unanimous)
| IFC Warriors Challenge 8
| 
| align=center| 2
| align=center| 10:00
| Friant, California, United States
| 
|-
| Win
| align=center| 4–0
| Dennis Muehy
| Submission (armbar)
| IFC Warriors Challenge 6
| 
| align=center| 1 
| align=center| 1:17
| Friant, California, United States
| 
|-
| Win
| align=center| 3–0
| Aaron Sampson
| Submission (armbar)
| Stockton Brawl
| 
| align=center| 1 
| align=center| 1:17
| Stockton, California, United States
| 
|-
| Win
| align=center| 2–0
| Vernon White
| Submission (armbar)
| Stockton Challenge 2
| 
| align=center| 1 
| align=center| 3:00
| Stockton, California, United States
|Won the Stockton Challenge 2 Tournament.
|-
| Win
| align=center| 1–0
| Allen Fernandez
| Submission (rear naked choke)
| Stockton Challenge 2
| 
| align=center| 1 
| align=center| 0:40
| Stockton, California, United States
|

References

External links
 
 
 Gil`s myspace

Living people
American male mixed martial artists
Mixed martial artists from California
Welterweight mixed martial artists
Mixed martial artists utilizing wrestling
Mixed martial artists utilizing Brazilian jiu-jitsu
American mixed martial artists of Mexican descent
American practitioners of Brazilian jiu-jitsu
American jujutsuka
People from Concord, California
1973 births
People from Pleasant Hill, California
Ultimate Fighting Championship male fighters